The Brazilian men's national 3x3 team represents Brazil in international 3x3 basketball matches and is controlled by the Confederação Brasileira de Basketball (Brazilian Basketball Confederation) – abbreviated as CBB.

Senior competitions

Summer Olympics

World Cup record

Youth competitions

Youth Olympic Games

Youth World Championships

Current squad
Squad members for 2021 FIBA 3x3 Olympic Qualifying Tournament.

See also
 3x3 basketball
 Brazil national basketball (full court) team
 Brazil women's national 3x3 team
 Brazil national under-19 basketball team
 Brazil national under-17 basketball team

References

External links
 

3
Men's national 3x3 basketball teams
3x3
Basketball in Brazil